Hitoshi Kiya from the Tokyo Metropolitan University, Tokyo, Japan was named Fellow of the Institute of Electrical and Electronics Engineers (IEEE) in 2016 for contributions to filter structure, data hiding, and multimedia security.

References 

Fellow Members of the IEEE
Living people
Academic staff of Tokyo Metropolitan University
Japanese electrical engineers
Year of birth missing (living people)
Place of birth missing (living people)